Piletocera maculifrons is a moth in the family Crambidae. It was described by George Hampson in 1917. It is found in Assam, India.

References

maculifrons
Moths described in 1917
Taxa named by George Hampson
Moths of Asia